Warrior Dash was a 5 km mud run put on by Red Frog Events, an event company based in Chicago, Illinois. As of July 31, 2019, Red Frog events is no longer a company and has cancelled all Warrior Dash races and ceased operations.

History

2009 
The inaugural Warrior Dash took place on July 18, 2009, in Joliet, Illinois, at CPX Sports with 2,000 participants.

2011 
The 2011 Warrior Dash season hosted 33 races throughout the U.S. and internationally in Canada and Australia.  Total participants for the 2011 season neared 700,000.

2012 
Red Frog Events hosted 49 Warriors Dash events in their 2012 season, their largest season yet.

2013

2019 
As of July 31, 2019, Red Frog Events announced that it will cease operations and all scheduled races were cancelled. They offered no refund for anyone, took money from participants and continued to advertise, knowing they were going to close up shop. Red Frog has not responded to messages. Other races have attempted to fill the gap by offering free admission for those registered for a Warrior Dash that was cancelled.

Registration
Registration for Warrior Dash takes place online prior to deadlines put forth by Red Frog Events. Pricing depends on location and the length of time until the event. All registrations close on the Tuesday before each specific event at 11:59 PM (CST).

With registration, each participant receives:
 Race bib
 As of 2014, races are self-timed.
 Warrior Dash participant T-shirt
 Warrior Dash helmet
 One free beer (for those who are of legal drinking age; redeemable by bib tear-off)
 Finisher medal
 Post-race snack and water

Race Day 
Race organizers provide parking on site or a free shuttle system from an off-site parking venue. Parking prices are currently $10 per car at each event. Warrior Dash organizers also provide a "Gear Check Tent" where participants are able to store belongings.

Runners gather in the start corral prior to their designated wave time. Participants will run approximately 5 km and complete at least 12 obstacles before reaching the finish line where they will receive a finisher medal, snack and water. The race is self-timed. There will be a clock at the start line. Racers are encouraged to bring a waterproof watch.

Warrior Dash provides additional forms of entertainment that vary at each event. Examples of such forms are axe-throwing contests, fireworks displays and chainsaw carving displays.

At each Warrior Dash, there are several awards presented to participants. Each participant is eligible to win awards for:
 Top three overall male and female times
 Top three males and females in each age division
 Best Warrior beard
 Best costume

Charity partnerships

St. Jude 
Each participant has the opportunity to raise funds for St. Jude's Children's Hospital. Warrior Dash does not contribute any portion of their revenue to St. Jude. Rather, all of the funds raised for St. Jude comes directly from the participants.

Fundraising opportunity 
Warrior Dash provides monetary donations to local organizations that volunteer at events. By volunteering at Warrior Dash, local organizations such as athletic teams, nearby school and non-profit organizations are able to raise funds based on the number of group members who volunteer at Warrior Dash.

Sponsorships 
Warrior Dash has multiple national sponsors as well as local sponsorship opportunities on a market basis.

Sponsors in 2011 include Bear Naked and Monster Energy. A sample of additional sponsors are:

According to a 2010 Warrior Dash participant survey administered by Red Frog Events, Warrior Dash on average draws participants from 47 states and three countries. According to the National Association of Sports Commissions (NASC), direct spending on average by Warrior Dash attendees from one event is $4.5 million. Of this total, the average revenue generated is $1.3 million from hotel sales, $1.3 million from restaurant sales, $849,000 from local store sales and $823,000 from attendee gas sales.

The survey also reports on average 26.9% of attendees purchase local hotel rooms, 63% of attendees dine at local restaurants, 32% of attendees shop at local businesses and 23.5% of attendees purchase gas from local stations.

Indianapolis-based PROS Consulting LLC has estimated an impact of $4,875,392 from participants, as well as 168 jobs created from tourist spending.

Closure of Red Frog Events 
As of July 31, 2019, Red Frog events announced their closure and has cancelled all Warrior Dash races and ceased operations.

See also 
 Tough Mudder
 Run For Your Lives
 Rugged Maniac
 Spartan Race

References

External links
Warrior Dash - Link is no longer active
Red Frog Events

Obstacle racing